Vidan Bojović (born 27 June 1979), is a Serbian futsal player who plays for Ekonomac Kragujevac and the Serbia national futsal team.

References

External links 
UEFA profile

1979 births
Living people
Serbian men's futsal players